Jason Fung (born in 1973) is a Canadian nephrologist and functional medicine advocate who promotes a low-carbohydrate high-fat diet and intermittent fasting. Fung disputes the current saturated fat guidelines.

Biography

Fung graduated with his medical degree from the University of Toronto, and completed his residency and fellowship in nephrology at the University of California, Los Angeles. He is the director of the nonprofit organization Public Health Collaboration.

Fung is an author of many low-carbohydrate diet books. His first book, The Complete Guide to Fasting, co-authored by Jimmy Moore was published in fall 2016 and offered insight to all aspects of fasting culture.

The Obesity Code and The Diabetes Code were subsequently published in 2016 and 2018. His book The Obesity Code Cookbook was published in 2019. In 2021, Fung co-authored The Diabetes Code Cookbook with Alison Maclean. In 2020, Fung co-authored with naturopath Nadia Brito Pateguana The PCOS Plan: Prevent and Reverse Polycystic Ovary Syndrome Through Diet and Fasting. His book The Cancer Code, published in 2020 advocates intermittent fasting and a low-carbohydrate diet to reduce cancer risk.

Fasting

Fung promotes intermittent fasting and more controversially water fasting. The fasting protocols promoted by Fung have been criticized as dangerous for those with pre-existing medical conditions as well those with a history of eating disorders. They have also been known to cause refeeding syndrome in fasting practitioners who fail to monitor their electrolyte levels under medical supervision.

Bibliography
The Complete Guide to Fasting (2016)
The Obesity Code (2016)
The Diabetes Code (2018)
The Obesity Code Cookbook (2019)
The PCOS Plan: Prevent and Reverse Polycystic Ovary Syndrome Through Diet and Fasting (2020)
The Cancer Code (2020)
The Diabetes Code Cookbook (2021)

References 

1973 births
21st-century Canadian non-fiction writers
Alternative cancer treatment advocates
Anti-obesity activists
Canadian health and wellness writers
Canadian nephrologists
Fasting advocates
Living people
Low-carbohydrate cookbook writers
Low-carbohydrate diet advocates
University of California, Los Angeles alumni
University of Toronto alumni